Michael James Benton  (born 8 April 1956) is a British palaeontologist, and professor of vertebrate palaeontology in the School of Earth Sciences at the University of Bristol. His published work has mostly concentrated on the evolution of Triassic reptiles but he has also worked on extinction events and faunal changes in the fossil record.

Education
Benton was educated at Robert Gordon's College,  the University of Aberdeen and Newcastle University where he was awarded a PhD in 1981.

Research and career
Benton's research investigates palaeobiology, palaeontology, and macroevolution.  His research interests include: diversification of life, quality of the fossil record, shapes of phylogenies, age-clade congruence, mass extinctions, Triassic ecosystem evolution, basal diapsid phylogeny, basal archosaurs, and the origin of the dinosaurs. He has made fundamental contributions to understanding the history of life, particularly concerning how biodiversity changes through time. He has led in integrating data from living and fossil organisms to generate phylogenies – solutions to the question of how major groups originated and diversified through time. This approach has revolutionised the understanding of major questions, including the relative roles of internal and external drivers on the history of life, whether diversity reaches saturation, the significance of mass extinctions, and how major clades radiate. A key theme is the Permian–Triassic extinction event, the largest mass extinction of all time, which took place over 250 million years ago, where he investigates how life was able to recover from such a devastating event.

Benton is the author of several palaeontology text books (e.g. Vertebrate Palaeontology) and children's books on the theme of dinosaurs. His work has been published in a variety of journals. Benton has also advised on many media productions including BBC's Walking with Dinosaurs and was a programme consultant for Paleoworld on Discovery Science. He also contributed to the 2002 BBC programme The Day The Earth Nearly Died, which featured scientists and dealt with the mysteries of the Permian extinction.

In December 2010, Benton had a rhynchosaur (Bentonyx) named in his honour.

Benton founded the Master of Science degree programme in Palaeobiology at Bristol in 1996, from which more than 300 students have graduated. He has supervised more than 50 PhD students.

As the Initiator of the Bristol Dinosaur Project Brenton was also involved with creating and designing the website for the project.

Publications
Dinosaurs an A-Z Guide (1988, Kingfisher) 
The phylogeny and classification of the tetrapods (1998, ed. Volumes 1 and 2)
Prehistoric Animals (1989, Kingfisher) 
Vertebrate Palaeontology (4th edition, 2014, Wiley-Blackwell) 
On the trail of the dinosaur (1989, Quarto Publishing) 
The reign of the reptiles (1991)
The rise of the mammals (1991)
The fossil record 2 (1993, ed.)
Dinosaur and Other Prehistoric Animal Fact Finder (1993)
Fossil reptiles of Great Britain (1995, with P. S. Spencer)
The Viking atlas of evolution (1997, with R. Osborne)
The Penguin historical atlas of the dinosaurs (1997)
Basic Palaeontology (1997, with D. A. T. Harper) 
Walking with dinosaurs: the facts (2000) 
The age of dinosaurs in Russia and Mongolia (2000, ed., with D. M. Unwin, M. A. Shishkin and E. N. Kurochkin)
Permian and Triassic red beds and the Penarth Group of Great Britain (2002, with E. Cook and P. J. Turner)
When life nearly died: the greatest mass extinction of all time (1st edition, 2003; 2nd edition, 2008)
Mesozoic and Tertiary fossil mammals and birds of Great Britain (2005, with L. Cook, D. Schreve, A Currant, and J. J. Hooker) 
Introduction to Paleobiology and the Fossil Record  (2009, with David A.T Harper) 
The first four billion years 
The Dinosaurs Rediscovered: How a Scientific Revolution is Rewriting History, (2019)

Honours and awards
Benton was elected a Fellow of the Royal Society (FRS) in 2014 for "substantial contributions to the improvement of natural knowledge" and a Fellow of the Royal Society of Edinburgh (FRSE).

He was appointed Officer of the Order of the British Empire (OBE) in the 2021 Birthday Honours for services to palaeontology and community engagement.

References

Living people
People educated at Robert Gordon's College
British palaeontologists
Scottish palaeontologists
Academics of the University of Bristol
Fellows of the Royal Society of Edinburgh
Lyell Medal winners
Fellows of the Royal Society
1956 births
Officers of the Order of the British Empire
Presidents of the Geologists' Association